The 1992 United States Senate election in New Hampshire was held November 3, 1992. Incumbent Republican U.S. Senator Warren Rudman decided to retire. Republican Judd Gregg won the open seat. It was his most competitive election, as he was able to easily defeat his opponents in other elections.

Major candidates

Democratic
 John Rauh, former CEO of Griffon Corporation

Republican
 Judd Gregg, Governor

Results

See also
 1992 United States Senate elections

References

1992 New Hampshire elections
New Hampshire
1992